Kalbarri Airport  in Kalbarri, Western Australia, opened on 22 September 2001 and is jointly owned by the Greenough and Northampton shires. The total construction costs for the airport was $1.7 million.

The airport required assessment of environmental impact prior to construction.

Airlines and destinations

See also
 List of airports in Western Australia
 Aviation transport in Australia

References

External links
Kalbarri Airport
 Airservices Aerodromes & Procedure Charts

Airports in Western Australia
Airports established in 2001